Wettin may refer to:

House of Wettin, a German Royal House
Wettin Castle, near Halle, Saxony-Anhalt, Germany, ancestral seat of the House of Wettin
Asteroid 90709 Wettin, named in the castle and House's honour
Wettin, Saxony-Anhalt, a town in Saxony-Anhalt, where Wettin Castle is located
Wettinus Augiensis (d. 824)
SMS Wettin, a German pre-dreadnought battleship